Riverside Park is the name of a former baseball ground located in Buffalo, New York, United States. The ground was home to the Buffalo Bisons baseball club of the International Association in 1878, and the National League from 1879 through 1883.

Although first used in 1878, its name as known to historians first surfaced in 1882. One local newspaper, employing that era's typical built-in editorializing, stated "The Directors have dubbed the ballgrounds 'Riverside Park.' The name is not appropriate, but it will do." [Buffalo Commercial, April 29, 1882, p.3] (The ballpark was at least 1,000 feet from the Niagara River bank.)

Located on a block bounded by Fargo Avenue (southwest), Rhode Island Street (northwest), West Avenue (northeast), and Vermont Street (southeast), Riverside Park was the first ballpark to be used by the major league Bisons. The stadium was demolished at the request of its owner, Alexander Culbert, who wanted to redevelop the property. The Bisons moved to Olympic Park for the 1884 season and beyond. The rectangular block is today part of the residential neighborhood of Prospect Hill.

Sports venues in Buffalo, New York
Buildings and structures in Buffalo, New York
Defunct baseball venues in the United States
Sports venues in New York (state)
Baseball venues in New York (state)